Daniel Ablett is a former Scotland Under 21 international rugby union player. A centre, he played professionally for Glasgow Warriors. He is now a surgeon.

Rugby Union career

Amateur career

Ablett went to Boroughmuir High School and then played rugby for Boroughmuir. Switching to play in Glasgow, he then played for Glasgow Academicals.

On the Academicals merger with Glasgow High Kelvinside he then turned out for the newly formed team Glasgow Hawks.

Professional career

Ablett first played for Glasgow Warriors in the pre-season matches against Sale Sharks on 16 August 1997 and against Caledonia Reds on 28 August 1997, coming on as a replacement for Alan Bulloch in the 65th minute.

He played for Glasgow Warriors in the European Rugby Cup (then known as the Heineken Cup). He made his competitive debut for the club as a replacement in the match against Swansea on 21 September 1997 - a 35-21 win for the provincial Glasgow side. He thus earned the Glasgow Warrior No. 39.

He made his next appearance, again in the Heineken Cup, playing in the away match against English side Wasps in a 43-5 defeat for the Glasgow side.

International career

Ablett played for Scotland Schools and then Scotland Under 21 sides.

Royal Navy career

Ablett served in the Royal Navy. He served in Afghanistan as a Lieutanent Surgeon and was awarded the Operational Service Medal by the Duchess of Cornwall.

Medical career

He is now a consultant surgeon at the University Hospitals in the north midlands of England.

References

1976 births
Living people
Glasgow Warriors players
Scottish rugby union players
Boroughmuir RFC players
Glasgow Hawks players
Glasgow Academicals rugby union players
Rugby union centres